Canuleius is a genus of walkingsticks in the family Heteronemiidae. There are at least 20 described species in Canuleius.

Species
These 21 species belong to the genus Canuleius:

References

Further reading

 
 
 

Phasmatodea